Fuad Bagir Seyidzadeh (1938 – 1972) was an Azerbaijani architect, co-author of the monument to the 77th Simferopol infantry division on the slope of Sapun mountain, Baku restaurant in Leningrad, and the author of numerous projects in the Baku mikrorayons.

Fuad is the son of an acclaimed Azerbaijani public figure, diplomat, journalist, honorary culture worker of the Azerbaijani SSR, Bagir Seidzade   ( Azerbaijani: Bağır Mirqasım oğlu Seyidzadə,  Russian: Багир Миргасым оглы Сеидзаде) and the brother of Dilara Seyizade ( Azerbaijani : Dilarə Seyidzadə Russian: Дилара Сеидзаде) as well as Xoshgadam Seyidzade (Azerbaijani : Xoşqədəm Seyidzade, Russian: Xошгадам Сеидзаде)

Fuad had a son, Ulvi Seyidzade (Azerbaijani : Ülvi Fuad oğlu Seyidzadə,  Russian: Ульви Фуад оглы Сейидзаде) and a daughter

Career 

From 1956 to 1957, Seyidzadeh studied at the Moscow Institute of Architecture. He was admitted to the drawing school as a second year student, proposed by People's Artist Mikayil Abdullayev.

As a qualified architect, Seyidzadeh worked on memorials to the 77th Simferopol infantry division on the slope of Sapun mountain in Sevastopol, alongside sculptor Omar Eldarov. Together with sculptor Tokay Mammadov, he also worked on the Baku restaurant in what was then Leningrad.

He died in Baku in 1972.

References

External links
 Monument to the 77th Simferopol infantry division on the slope of Sapun mountain
 Film about Fuad Seyidzadeh {lang-az}

20th-century Azerbaijani architects
1938 births
1972 deaths